Trefeinon railway station was a station to the south of Trefeca, Powys, Wales. The station was closed in 1962. The station had a signal box.

References

Further reading

Disused railway stations in Powys
Railway stations in Great Britain opened in 1864
Railway stations in Great Britain closed in 1962
Former Cambrian Railway stations